Aleksei Petrov (also spelled Aleksey, Alexey, or Alexei) may refer to:

 Aleksei Petrov (cyclist) (1937–2009), Soviet cyclist who won bronze medal at the 1960 Olympics
 Alexei Petrov (ice hockey) (born 1983), Russian professional ice hockey defenceman
 Aleksey Petrov (weightlifter) (born 1974), Russian weightlifter
 Alexey A. Petrov (born 1971), American physicist
 Aleksei Zinovyevich Petrov (1910–1972), mathematician

See also
 Alyaksey Pyatrow (born 1991), Belarusian footballer